Kelly Thompson is an American writer of novels and comic books. She is best known for the Jem and the Holograms comic with co-creator and artist Sophie Campbell, a modern re-imagining of the 1980s cartoon of the same name, the Eisner-nominated Marvel comic Hawkeye with artist  Leonardo Romero, which stars Kate Bishop, and Captain Marvel featuring Carol Danvers with artist Carmen Carnero and colorist Tamra Bonvillain. Her other works include A-Force, West Coast Avengers, The Girl Who Would Be King, Jessica Jones and Mr and Mrs X among others. She is also the co-creator of Jeff the Land Shark with Daniele Di Nicuolo.

Career

Thompson stated she had "been writing in some way shape or form for about as long as [she] can remember." Thompson graduated from the Savannah College of Art and Design with a degree in Sequential Art. She got her start in the comics industry as staff writer for the website CBR, where she worked from 2009 to 2015 writing reviews and her column called She Has No Head!, centered around women in comics. In 2012 she launched a kickstarter campaign for her first novel, The Girl Who Would Be King. The crowdfund campaign reached $26,478, 330% of its original goal, and was released in September of that same year. The story involves two girls with extraordinary powers, one who uses them for good, one for bad, who are about to meet for the first time. In 2014 the novel was optioned for a movie adaptation by Logan Pictures. Thompson told io9, "We had a lot of interest in the book. I think we had at least half a dozen legitimate companies inquiring about the rights. We also had some more intimate interest from writers and smaller producers, a couple film agents also came calling."

At the 2014 New York Comic Con, IDW Publishing revealed it had got the comic book license for the '80s rock-n-roll adventure cartoon Jem and the Holograms. A month later, IDW revealed that they hired Thompson to write the first Jem and the Holograms comic with artist Sophie Campbell, a modern re-imagining of the series. She wrote the comic for two years, with the first issue released in March 2015 and the ongoing concluding with issue #26 on June 14, 2017. During the 2015 "Secret Wars" storyline, she co-wrote her first Marvel comic, a four issue tie-in series titled Captain Marvel and the Carol Corps with Kelly Sue DeConnick. In 2016, Thompson and Brenden Fletcher wrote a spin-off six-issue Power Rangers mini-series titled Mighty Morphin Power Rangers: Pink for Boom! Studios. The mini was focused on the Pink Ranger. She also wrote the solo series of Kate Bishop, the second Hawkeye. It follows Bishop, who opens her own detective company on the west coast of the United States. For her work on Hawkeye she was nominated for an Eisner for best continuing series in 2018. It was cancelled by Marvel after 16 issues in 2018.

In January 2018, Marvel Comics announced it had signed Thompson to an exclusive contract. That same month, the first issue of Rogue & Gambit was released, which was announced ahead of New York Comic Con 2017. It follows Rogue and Gambit, who reignite their relationship while investigating the disappearance of mutants at a vacation resort. Following the success of Rogue & Gambit, the two characters got married in X-Men Gold #30 in a surprise twist. Initially the wedding was for the X-Men Kitty Pryde and Colossus, but according to X-Men Gold writer Marc Guggenheim Marvel changed their plans. After the wedding issue was released, the planned ongoing called Mr. and Mrs. X, also written by Thompson, was revealed to be about Rogue and Gambit as a married couple. She also wrote a five-issue Nancy Drew comic, which followed the titular character as a 17-year-old who has to return to the home she'd left behind and solve a mystery that involves childhood friends and someone who's out to end Nancy's crime-fighting career permanently with her death. It was published by Dynamite. Starting that July, Thompson took over Jessica Jones from Brian Michael Bendis. Jessica Jones was the first line of 'digital original'-only titles, which were primarily focused on Marvel characters who have their own television series in the Marvel Cinematic Universe. They were 40-page sized issues released every month over the course of three months, and were later released as physical trade paperbacks.

In October 2018, it was announced she also would write the new ongoing of Captain Marvel featuring Carol Danvers with artist Carmen Carnero and colorist Tamra Bonvillain, the first issue of which was released on January 9, 2019 and sold more than a hundred thousand copies, Thompson's first comic to reach this milestone. Starting in March 2019, Thompson also wrote a new five-issue Sabrina the Teenage Witch mini for Archie Comics, which concluded in September of that same year. The miniseries was met with critical acclaim and it won 2019's IGN People's Choice award. She was also co-writer of the X-Men storyline "X-Men: Disassembled".

In June 2019, Thompson joined the Shots Fired project to raise money to combat gun violence. The comic will be published by Comicker Press, and is scheduled to be released later this year after a successful Kickstarter funding campaign. The proceeds from the book's sale are going to the Coalition to Stop Gun Violence and the Community Justice Reform Coalition.

That same month, the team responsible for the Captain Marvel ongoing was added to the first issue of the all-female Marvel Fearless anthology. The four-issue mini-series explores various female superheroes, including Invisible Woman, Storm, Captain Marvel, Millie the Model and Jessica Jones. Every issue is created entirely by women, including variant covers, and the first issue was released on July 24.

Thompson was one of the writers on a Spider-Man story called Amazing Spider-Man: Full Circle #1. The comic follows Peter Parker, who goes on a globe-hopping adventure. It was released on October 23, 2019.

She created the character of Jeff the Landshark in West Coast Avengers and writes a Marvel Unlimited-exclusive solo title, It's Jeff!, starting 2021.

In 2021, it was announced that Thompson had signed a deal with Substack to create exclusive comics, such as Black Cloak, with artwork done by her Jem collaborator Meredith McClaren, and The Cull, with art done by Mattia de Lulis. In 2022, it was announced that Black Cloak would receive a print release via Image Comics in January 2023.

Awards
For her work on Hawkeye, Thompson was nominated for an Eisner Award for Best Continuing Series in 2018. A year later, she was nominated for an Eisner Award for Best writer for her work on Nancy Drew (Dynamite); Hawkeye, Jessica Jones, Mr. & Mrs. X, Rogue & Gambit, Uncanny X-Men and West Coast Avengers (Marvel).
In 2021 she won an Eisner Award for Best New Series for her work on Black Widow.

Bibliography

Books
 The Girl Who Would Be King 368 pages, 2012, 
 Storykiller 286 pages, 2014,

Comics

IDW Publishing
 Jem and the Holograms #1-26 (March 2015-June 2017)
 Volume 1: Showtime (tpb, 152 pages, 2015) collects:
 "Showtime" (with Sophie Campbell, in #1-6, 2015)
 Volume 2: Viral (tpb, 152 pages, 2016) collects:
 "Viral" (with Emma Vieceli, in #7-9, 2015)
 "Rio Pacheco Boy Reporter" (with Corin Howell, in #10, 2015)
 Jem and the Holograms Outrageous Annual 2015 (with among other artist, 2015)
 Jem and the Holograms Holiday Special (with Amy Mebberson, 2015)
 Volume 3: Dark Jem (tpb, 136 pages, 2016) collects:
 "Dark Jem" (with Sophie Campbell, in #11-16, 2016)
 Volume 4: Enter The Stingers (tpb, 152 pages, 2017) collects:
 "Ch-ch-changes" (with Jen Bartel, in #17-18, 2016)
 "Enter the Stingers" (with Meredith McClaren, in #19-23, 2016-2017)
 Volume 5: Truly Outrageous (tpb, 124 pages, 2017) collects:
 "Truly Outrageous" (with Gisele Lagace, in #24-26, 2007)
 Jem and the Holograms Outrageous Annual 2017 (with various artists, 2017)
 Ghostbusters: Deviations, one-shot (with Nelson Daniel, March 2016) collected in Deviations: In a World... Where Everything Changed (tpb, 136 pages, 2016)
 Constance & Nano: Engineering Adventure #1, one-shot (with by Nicoletta Baldari, October 2016)
 Jem: The Misfits #1-5 (with Jenn St-Onge, December 2016-June 2017)

Dark Horse Comics
 Creepy #20, "Verto" (with Ramon Bachs, April 2015)
 Heart in a Box (seven-issue limited series with Meredith McClaren, May–July 2015, tpb, 160 pages, 2015)

Marvel Comics
 Captain Marvel and the Carol Corps (four-issue limited series with Kelly Sue DeConnick, David López, Laura Braga and Paolo Pantalena June–September 2015, collected in Captain Marvel and the Carol Corps, tpb, 120 pages, 2015)
 A-Force vol. 2 #2-10 (February 2016-October 2016)
 Volume 1: Hypertime #2-4 (with G. Willow Wilson and Jorge Molina, tpb, 146 pages, 2016)
 Volume 2: Rage Against the Dying of the Light #5-10 (with Ben Caldwell and Paulo Siqueira, tpb, 136 pages, 2017)
 Star Wars Annual vol. 2 #2 (with Emilio Laiso, November 2016)
 Hawkeye vol. 5 #1-16 (November 2016-March 2018)
 Volume 1: Anchor Points #1-6 (with Leonardo Romero and Michael Walsh, tpb, 136 pages, 2017)
 Volume 2: Masks #7-12 (with Leonardo Romero and Michael Walsh, tpb, 136 pages, 2018)
 Volume 3: Family Reunion #13-16 and Generations: Hawkeye & Hawkeye #1 (with Leonardo Romero and Stefano Raffaele, tpb, 112 pages, 2018)
 Generations: The Archers #1 (with Stefano Raffaele, August 2017) collected in Generations (hc, 328 pages, 2017)
 Journey to Star Wars: The Last Jedi - Captain Phasma #1-4 (with Marco Checchetto, September–October 2017) collected in Star Wars: Journey to Star Wars: The Last Jedi - Captain Phasma (tpb, 112 pages, 2017)
 Rogue & Gambit #1-5 (with Pere Pérez, January–May 2018) collected in Rogue & Gambit: Ring of Fire (tpb, 112 pages, 2018)
 Jessica Jones (July 2018-May 2019)
 Volume 1: Blind Spot #1-3 (with Mattia de Iulis, tpb, 192 pages, 2018)
 Volume 2: Purple Daughter #1-3 (with Mattia de Iulis, tpb, 136 pages, 2019)
 Mr. & Mrs. X #1-12 (July 2018-June 2019)
 Volume 1: Love And Marriage #1-6 (Oscar Bazaldua, tpb, 136 pages, 2019)
 Volume 2: Gambit and Rogue Forever #7-12 (Oscar Bazaldua, tpb, 136 pages, 2019)
 West Coast Avengers #1-10 (August 2018-April 2019)
 Volume 1: Best Coast #1-5 (with Stefano Caselli, tpb, 144 pages, 2019)
 Volume 2: City of Evils #6-10 (with Daniele di Nicuolo and Gang Hyuk Lim, tpb, 112 pages, 2019)
 Captain Marvel #1- (January 2019-present)
 Volume 1: Re-Entry #1-5 (with Carmen Carnero & Annapaola Martello, tpb, 144 pages, 2019)
 Volume 2: Falling Star #6-11 (with Carmen Carnero & Annapaola Martello, tpb, 136 pages, 2020)
 Volume 3: The Last Avenger #12-16 (with Lee Garbett, tpb, 112 pages, 2020)
 Volume 4: Accused #17-21 (with Francesco Manna & Cory Smith, tpb, 2020)
 Volume 5: The New World #22-26 (with Lee Garbett and Belen Orgeta, tpb, 2021)
 Volume 6: Strange Magic #27-30 (with David Lopez and Jacopo Camagni, tpb, 2021 )
 Volume 7: The Last of the Marvels #31-36 (with Takeshi Miyazawa and Sergio Davila, tpb, 2022)
 Uncanny X-Men #1-10 (with Matthew Rosenberg, Ed Brisson, Mahmud Asrar and R. B. Silva, November 2018 - January 2019) collected in Uncanny X-Men: X-Men Disassembled (tpb, 248 pages, 2019)
 Deadpool #1-10 (November 2019-January 2021)
 Volume 1: Hail to the King #1-6 (with Chris Bachalo & Gerardo Sandoval, tpb, 112 pages, 2019)
 Volume 2: #7-10 (with Gerardo Sandoval, tpb, 112 pages, 2021)
 Black Widow #1-15 (September 2020-April 2022)

Dynamite Comics
 Nancy Drew #1-5 (with Jenn St-Onge, June – October 2018) collected in Nancy Drew: The Palace Of Wisdom (tpb, 128 pages, 2019)

Boom! Studios
 Lumberjanes: Don't Axe, Don't Tale 2016 Special (with Jen Wang, Christine Norrie and Savanna Ganucheau, May 2016)
Mighty Morphin Power Rangers: Pink (six-issue limited series with Brenden Fletcher, Tini Howard and Daniele di Nicuolo, June–December 2016, tpb, 160 pages, 2017)
 Adventure Time Comics #3 (with other artists, September 2016)
 Mega Princess #1-5 (with Brianne Drouhard, November 2016 - April 2017) collected in Mega Princess (tpb, 128 pages, 2017)

Archie Comics
 Sabrina the Teenage Witch #1-5 (with Veronica Fish, March - September 2019) collected in Sabrina the Teenage Witch (tpb, 144 pages, 2019)

References

21st-century American novelists
American comics writers
American women novelists
Female comics writers
Living people
Marvel Comics people
Marvel Comics writers
Place of birth missing (living people)
Savannah College of Art and Design alumni
Year of birth missing (living people)
21st-century American women writers